Ex Hex is the third solo album from Mary Timony. It was released April 19, 2005 on Lookout! Records.

Track listing
 "On the Floor" – 4:25
 "Friend to J.C." – 3:26
 "Silence" – 6:10
 "In the Grass" – 4:33
 "Return to Pirates" – 3:51
 "Hard Times are Hard" – 4:34
 "9x3" – 4:15
 "W.O.W." – 2:59
 "Moon Song" – 3:38
 "Harmony" – 2:15
 "Backwards/Forwards" – 6:40

References

2005 albums